Sam Hollander is an American songwriter. He has collaborated with the likes of Panic! at the Disco, Fitz and the Tantrums, Train, Weezer, Daughtry, Gym Class Heroes, Tom Morello, Metro Station, Boys Like Girls, All Time Low among others.

Career
Hollander was born in New York, NY and attended Fox Lane High School. He has written and/or produced 22 US Top 40 Pop songs, including Panic! at the Disco's "High Hopes".

In 2008, he was named Rolling Stone Hot List Producer of the Year, alongside Dave "Sluggo" Katz.
He served as a Governor of the New York Chapter of The National Academy of Recording Arts and Sciences (The GRAMMYs) from 2011 to 2013.

In 2012, he was the music producer for the NBC TV show Smash, for which he produced the Emmy-nominated song "I Heard Your Voice In A Dream.

In 2019, Hollander sold his songwriting catalogue to Hipgnosis Songs Fund. and he held the #1 position on the Billboard Rock Songwriters chart for nine weeks, a year-end record.

He serves on the LA Advisory Board for Musicians On Call and is the co-founder of the Sony Masterworks holiday supergroup, Band of Merrymakers.

He is currently the songwriter and music producer for the NBC TV show Ordinary Joe.

Personal life
He is the son of interior decorator and collector Judith Hollander, and José Limon Company dancer/Pratt Institute Professor Michael Hollander, and the nephew of American poet John Hollander. In December 2013, Hollander wrote an obituary dedicated to his uncle in the New York Times entitled "My uncle, the poet and the pop star".

Selected discography
Panic! at the Disco "High Hopes" (Fueled By Ramen/Atlantic) (writer) 
 RIAA certified 5× PLATINUM,   #1 US TOP 40,    #1 US HOT AC,   #1 US ALTERNATIVE,   #1 US ROCK SONGS,  
 2019 BILLBOARD MUSIC AWARDS ROCK SONG OF THE YEAR,  2× ASCAP Pop Award Winner 
Fitz and the Tantrums "HandClap" (Elektra) (writer)
 RIAA certified 4× PLATINUM,  #5 US HOT AC,   #5 US ALTERNATIVE,   #8 US ROCK SONGS,    BMI Pop Award Winner 
Gym Class Heroes "Cupid's Chokehold" (Decaydance/Fueled By Ramen) (producer)
 RIAA certified 3× PLATINUM,   #1 US TOP 40,   #3 UK TOP 40
BANNERS "Someone To You" (Island) (writer) 
 RIAA certified PLATINUM,  #13 US HOT AC
Panic! at the Disco "Hey Look Ma, I Made It" (Fueled By Ramen/Atlantic) (writer)
 RIAA certified 2× PLATINUM,  #1 US ROCK SONGS,   #3 US HOT AC,   #5 US ALTERNATIVE,   #6 US TOP 40,   
 2020 BILLBOARD MUSIC AWARDS ROCK SONG OF THE YEAR, 2019 TEEN CHOICE AWARDS ROCK SONG OF THE YEAR,  ASCAP Pop Award Winner
James TW "When You Love Someone" (Island Records) (writer)
 RIAA certified GOLD,  BPI certified Platinum
Weezer "Records" (Crush/Atlantic) (writer)
 #1 US ALTERNATIVE
Blink-182 "Blame It On My Youth" / "Happy Days" (Columbia) (writer) 
 #9 US ROCK SONGS
Macklemore "Next Year" (Bendo Records/Warner Brothers) (writer) 
Metro Station "Shake It" (Columbia) (producer)
 RIAA certified 2× PLATINUM,  #3 US TOP 40 
One Direction "Rock Me" (Columbia/SYCO) (writer)
 IFPI certified PLATINUM  from the  RIAA certified 3× PLATINUM album  Take Me Home 
Ringo Starr "Teach Me To Tango", "Thank God For Music", "Better Days" (Universal Music) (writer/producer)
Def Leppard "Fire It Up" (Mercury Records) (writer)
Billy Idol "Rita Hayworth" (Dark Horse Records) (writer)
Train "Save Me San Francisco" (Columbia) (writer)
 RIAA certified GOLD,  #3 US AC,   #7 US HOT AC,  BMI Pop Award Winner  
Train "Marry Me" (Columbia) (writer)
 RIAA certified 2× PLATINUM,  #4 US HOT AC,   BMI Pop Award Winner 
Boys Like Girls "The Great Escape" (Columbia) (writer)
 RIAA certified PLATINUM,  #8 US TOP 40,   BMI Pop Award winner   
Boys Like Girls "Love Drunk" (Columbia) (writer)
 RIAA certified PLATINUM,  #8 US TOP 40  
Daughtry  "Waiting for Superman" (RCA) (writer)
 RIAA certified PLATINUM,  #11 US HOT AC
We The Kings "Check Yes Juliet" (S-Curve/EMI) (writer/producer)
 RIAA certified PLATINUM / ARIA certified PLATINUM 
Panic! at the Disco "Emperor's New Clothes" (Fueled By Ramen/Atlantic) (writer)
 RIAA certified PLATINUM 
Panic! at the Disco "Say Amen (Saturday Night)" (Fueled By Ramen/Atlantic) (writer)
 RIAA certified PLATINUM,  #1 US ALTERNATIVE,   #1 US ROCK SONGS   
Panic! at the Disco "Roaring 20s" (Fueled By Ramen/Atlantic)  (writer) 
 RIAA certified GOLD
Panic! at the Disco "Crazy=Genius" (Fueled By Ramen/Atlantic) (writer) 
 RIAA certified GOLD
Panic! at the Disco "Impossible Year", "Golden Days" (Fueled By Ramen/Atlantic) 
 from the  GRAMMY-nominated  RIAA certified 2× PLATINUM album  Death of a Bachelor  (writer) 
Panic! at the Disco "Dancing's Not A Crime", "King Of The Clouds", "Drunks", "Old Fashioned" (Fueled By Ramen/Atlantic) (writer)
 from the RIAA certified PLATINUM album  Pray for the Wicked
 2019 BILLBOARD MUSIC AWARDS ROCK ALBUM OF THE YEAR  
Goo Goo Dolls "Miracle Pill" (Warner Brothers) (writer)
 #19 US HOT AC  
Jewel "Grateful" (Crush) (writer)
Carole King "Love Makes The World" (Koch) (writer/producer)   
Arashi Party Starters (J-Storm) (writer/producer) from the RIAJ certified 3× PLATINUM "This Is Arashi"
 #7 JAPAN HOT 100   
Good Charlotte "Sex on the Radio" (Capitol) (writer)
 ARIA certified PLATINUM  
Pentatonix "Sing", "New Year's Day" (RCA) from the  RIAA certified GOLD album  Pentatonix (writer)
Gym Class Heroes "As Cruel as School Children" (Decaydance/Fueled By Ramen) (writer/producer)
 RIAA certified GOLD  
Aloe Blacc "King Is Born" (Interscope) (writer/producer)
Fitz and the Tantrums "Roll Up", "Run It", "Get Right Back" (writer)  
Katy Perry "If You Can Afford Me" (Capitol) 
 from the RIAA certified PLATINUM album One Of The Boys (writer/producer)
Karmin "Acapella" (Epic) (writer)
 RIAA certified GOLD / ARIA certified 3× PLATINUM  
Metro Station "Seventeen Forever" (Columbia) (producer)
 RIAA certified GOLD  
Kelly Rowland "Daylight" (Columbia) (producer) 
 #5 UK R&B
Tom Morello ft. *Ben Harper "Raising Hell" (mom+pop) (writer)
Tom Morello ft. *Barns Courtney "Human" (mom+pop) (writer)
Walk The Moon "Rise Up" (RCA) (writer)
Saint Motel "Preach" (Elektra) (writer)
The Band Camino "I Think I Like You" (Elektra) (writer)
 #12 US HOT AC 
Weezer "I Love The USA" (Crush/Atlantic) (writer)
We The Kings "Say You Like Me" (S-Curve/EMI)  (writer/producer)
 ARIA certified GOLD  
Olly Murs "Beautiful To Me" (Epic) from the BPI certified 2× PLATINUM album Never Been Better (writer)  
Delta Goodrem "Encore" (Sony) from the  ARIA certified GOLD  Wings of the Wild (writer)
Chiddy Bang "Mind Your Manners" (Polydor) (writer/producer)
 ARIA certified 2× PLATINUM  
Chiddy Bang "Happening" (Polydor) (writer/producer)
 ARIA certified GOLD  
Chiddy Bang "Ray Charles" (Polydor) (writer/producer)
 #13 UK TOP 40  
The O'Jays "The Last Word" (S-Curve) (writer/producer)
Tom Jones "I'm Alive" (S-Curve/EMI) from the BPI certified Gold album 24 Hours (producer)
Mike Love Reason for the Season (BMG) (writer/producer)
Joe Cocker "The Last Road" (Columbia) (writer) 
Cliff Richard "Christmas with Cliff" (East West Records) BPI certified Silver album (producer)
Neon Trees "Your Surrender", "I Am The DJ" (Island Records) (writer)
 #18 US HOT AC  
DNCE "Can You Feel It" (RCA) for the movie and soundtrack "My Little Pony: The Movie (writer)
Capital Cities "Venus & River" (Capitol) (writer)
Coheed and Cambria "The Running Free" (Columbia) (writer)
 #19 US ALTERNATIVE  
Hollywood Undead "Hear Me Now" (Octone Records) (writer/producer) 
 RIAA certified GOLD  
Owl City "Speed of Love" (Universal Republic) (writer) 
Violent Femmes "Holy Ghost", "Foothills", "Issues" (writer) 
Andy Grammer "Damn It Feels Good To Be Me" (S-Curve) (writer)
 #14 US HOT AC  
Train "This'll Be My Year" (Columbia) 
 from the  RIAA certified GOLD album  California 37 (writer)  
The Fray "Same As You" (Epic) (writer)
Barenaked Ladies "Lookin Up" (Vanguard) (writer) 
American Authors "Microphone" (Island) (writer)  
Sugar Ray "Girls Were Made To Love" (Pulse) (writer/producer)
Blues Traveler "Suzie Cracks the Whip" (429) (producer)
Matt Nathanson "Earthquake Weather" "Heart Starts"  (Vanguard) (writer)
Michael Franti & Spearhead "Wherever You Are", "I Don't Wanna Go" (Capitol) (writer)
Rebelution "Santa Barbara" (Easy Star Records) from the  GRAMMY  nominated "Falling Into Place (writer)"
G. Love & Special Sauce f/ Keb Mo & Robert Randolph "Birmingham" 
 from the GRAMMY nominated album "The Juice" (writer) 
The Record Company "How High" (Concord Records) (writer) 
 #4 US AAA  
Matisyahu "Happy Hannukah," "Champion" (writer)
O.A.R. "Lay Down" (Lava) (writer)
Brett Dennen "Out Of My Head" (Atlantic) (writer)
Uncle Kracker "Hot Mess" (Atlantic) (writer/producer)
Trombone Shorty "Dream On" (Verve) (writer/producer)
Allen Stone "Symmetrical" (Capitol Records) (writer)
Andrew McMahon in the Wilderness "Canyon Moon" (writer)
The Struts "Freak Like You" (Interscope) (writer/producer) 
Daughtry  "Battleships" (RCA) from the  RIAA certified GOLD album Baptized (album) (writer) 
 #20 US HOT AC
Cobra Starship "Bring It (Snakes on a Plane)" (Decaydance/New Line) 
 for the movie and soundtrack "Snakes on a Plane (writer/producer)
All Time Low "Lost in Stereo" (Interscope) 
 from the  RIAA certified GOLD  album Nothing Personal (writer/producer)
All Time Low "Holly (Would You Turn Me On" (Interscope) 
 from the  RIAA certified GOLD  album So Wrong, It's Right (writer)
Big Time Rush "Til' I Forget About You" (Columbia)  
 RIAA certified GOLD (writer/producer)
Big Time Rush "Big Night" (Columbia)  
 from the  RIAA certified GOLD album  BTR (writer/producer)
Arrested Development "Since The Last Time" (Edel/Pony Canyon) (writer/producer)
The Virgins "The Virgins" (Atlantic) (producer)
Bowling For Soup "Only Young" (Jive Records) (writer)
Hot Chelle Rae "Honestly" (RCA) (writer/producer)
Descendants 2 "Ways To Be Wicked" (Hollywood) (writer/producer) 
 RIAA certified PLATINUM  
Descendants "Set It Off" (Hollywood) 
 from the  RIAA certified GOLD album  (writer/producer)
Glee Cast "Candles" (Columbia) for the show Glee (writer)
Static Revenger "Happy People" (Ministry of Sound) (writer)
 #23 UK TOP 40  
Cooler Kids "All Around The World" (DreamWorks) The Lizzie McGuire Movie  
 RIAA certified PLATINUM  (writer/producer)
Blake Lewis "Heartbreak on Vinyl" Tommy Boy) (writer/producer)
 #1 US DANCE CLUB PLAY,   #1 US DANCE AIRPLAY 
SMASH Cast “Voice In A Dream" (Columbia) for the show SMASH (producer)
EMMY NOMINATED 
Toothpick "Supersize Me" for the ACADEMY AWARD nominated documentary Supersize Me (writer/producer)

References

External links
In the New York Times Armed With Guitar and Emotions

Living people
Record producers from New York (state)
Songwriters from New York (state)
Writers from New York City
Jewish American songwriters
Year of birth missing (living people)